The Ohio Wisler Mennonite Churches, also called Ohio Wisler Mennonite Conference, are a group of churches with a Mennonite tradition, that formed in 1973. They are not considered to be Old Order anymore, but are widely seen as Conservative Mennonites. Stephen Scott lists them as "Ultra Conservative" (Mennonites).

History 

In 1973 a large group of Wisler Mennonites in Ohio split from the Ohio-Indiana Mennonite Conference, a car-driving Old Order Mennonite group, and formed the more modern Ohio Wisler Mennonites.

Customs and beliefs 

After the division from the Ohio-Indiana Mennonite Conference, the Ohio Wisler Mennonites adopted Sunday Schools and a more aggressive approach to outreach. They have altered the manner of worship from the Old Order form.

Members and congregation

In 1995 the Ohio Wisler Mennonite Churches had 131 households in four congregations. In the year 2000 they had 421 adherents with a total population of about 800 people in five congregations, all in Ohio. According to website of the Mennonite World Conference they had 322 adherents in four congregations in 2018.

References 

Mennonitism
Anabaptism
 
Anabaptist denominations established in the 20th century
Mennonitism in the United States
Conservative organizations in the United States